Magnum XL-200, colloquially known as simply Magnum, is a steel roller coaster built by Arrow Dynamics at Cedar Point in Sandusky, Ohio. When it opened in 1989, it was the tallest, fastest, and steepest complete-circuit roller coaster in the world as well as the first hypercoaster – a roller coaster that exceeds  in height. Some have credited Magnum with starting a period in the industry known as the roller coaster wars, in which amusement parks competed with one another at a rapid pace to build the next tallest and fastest roller coaster. More than 40 million people had ridden Magnum by 2009.

Magnum XL-200 held the title of tallest roller coaster in the world until 1994 when The Big One opened at Blackpool Pleasure Beach in the United Kingdom, as well as the title of longest drop and fastest speed until surpassed two years later by Steel Phantom at Kennywood Park outside of Pittsburgh. Amusement Today Golden Ticket Awards ranked the ride as the best steel roller coaster each year from 1998 to 2000.

History
By the mid-1980s, Cedar Point had grown into a successful collection of roller coasters and other smaller rides on the shores of Lake Erie. Dick Kinzel took over as president and CEO of Cedar Fair, the company that operates the park, in 1986. In 1988, Kinzel saw a report on CNN about the opening of a new coaster in Japan called Bandit at Yomiuriland that emphasized height and speed but had no inversions. Kinzel wanted to introduce a similar coaster that emphasized steep drops and negative g-forces over inversions and spins, which were common at the time. It had been 10 years since the last major addition, Gemini, was introduced. Cedar Point asked for proposals from TOGO, Dinn Corporation, Intamin and Arrow Dynamics to build a roller coaster without inversions or over-the-shoulder restraints. They chose Arrow, due to the weakness of the dollar at the time, which eliminated overseas production. Arrow was also working on the new Iron Dragon at the time. Arrow and Ron Toomer proposed a -tall coaster, to best the then-largest roller coaster drop on Shockwave at Six Flags Great America. That got Cedar Point's management interested in breaking the  barrier, partly because of the publicity to be gained from building the first roller coaster to do so. The name Magnum XL-200 was chosen because Magnum, P.I. was popular at the time. Funds from Cedar Fair going public on the New York Stock Exchange in April 1987 were used to fund the ride.

Construction and opening

Magnum XL-200 was announced on August 16, 1988, and construction began shortly thereafter. Following its completion in 1989, Kinzel was one of the first people to ride the coaster, boarding the train after one test cycle. It officially opened to the public on May 6, 1989 as the world's tallest, fastest and steepest complete-circuit roller coaster. It was measured for the Guinness Book of World Records on June 2. Cedar Point set a record attendance in 1989, due in part to the introduction of the Magnum.

Magnum is often credited as shifting the focus of Cedar Point, as noted by then-park Vice President, John Hildebrandt: "We all were smart enough to know we had something. Big steel made a big difference and with Magnum we started branding ourselves as a big time roller coaster park". Magnum was awarded the ACE Roller Coaster Landmark award on June 21, 2004. To date, Magnum has been repainted once; the original track color was scarlet red, and later repainted Molly orange in late 2005 which was completed in 2006. Cedar Point celebrated Magnum's 20th anniversary on opening day in 2009 with a ceremony and an appearance by Ron Toomer, its designer. A new entrance sign was also introduced.

Magnum XL-200 has been the target of false rumors since 1998 claiming the structure was sinking due to unstable ground. The rumors supposedly started as an April Fools' Day joke in an Ohio newspaper, but quickly spread via the Internet. Cedar Point quickly denounced such rumors.

In 2019, Magnum XL-200 celebrated its 30th anniversary. The ride was repainted and new special effects were installed in the third tunnel.

Ride experience

Layout
The train then ascends a  camelback hill, curving to the left into the first tunnel. Coming out of the tunnel, the train ascends a third, -tall hill. After the third hill, it enters a set of trim brakes and a pretzel-shaped turnaround where it curves to the left toward the beach and then left again into another tunnel. The train then traverses over seven airtime hills and a third tunnel into a mid-course brake run. The train turns left and goes back over the walkway to Cedar Point Shores. It then turns right and enters the brake run, followed by a 90 degree right turn back into the station. One cycle of the ride lasts about 2 minutes.

Trains

Magnum XL-200 has three white-and-black trains. Each train has red, black or blue striping at the front. Each train has six cars; riders are arranged two-across in three rows for a total of 36 riders per train. Riders are secured by an individual ratcheting lap bar and a seat belt.

When Magnum XL-200 opened, it used up-stop pads similar to those still in use on Gemini, as well as Cedar Creek Mine Ride. Shortly after its debut, however, these up-stop plates were replaced with more traditional up-stop wheels that stops excess wear and tear.

Track
The track consists of a tubular steel spine connected by struts to tubular steel running rails. Like other Arrow coasters at the time, sections of Magnum's track were hand-welded together in place without the assistance of computer-aided design, leading to bumpy, non-smooth transitions throughout the course of the ride.

Incident
Two people were taken to a first aid station, and a third person was taken to a local hospital because of an asthma attack. The ride reopened the next day and park spokesman Robin Innes said the accident was caused by rain: "We think it was just caused by excessive moisture on the tracks due to the heavy rain storms we had in the morning."

Awards and rankings

Magnum XL-200 was designated an ACE Roller Coaster Landmark on June 21, 2004, at the 27th Annual Convention of the American Coaster Enthusiasts. It received the designation for inspiring more than a dozen similar rides on three continents and for being the first hypercoaster.

Records

References

External links

 Cedarpoint.com - Magnum XL-200's official page
 Magnum XL-200 1987 News Broadcasts
 Magnum XL-200 at Coaster-Net
 Magnum XL-200 at The Point Online

Cedar Point
Roller coasters introduced in 1989
Roller coasters operated by Cedar Fair
Roller coasters in Ohio